Areti Abatzi (born 14 May 1974) is a Greek discus thrower.

She finished sixth at the 2002 European Championships and ninth at the 2006 World Cup. She also competed at the 1997 World Championships without reaching the finals.

Her personal best throw is 62.95 metres, achieved in July 2001 in Patras. This places her fourth on the Greek all-time performers list, behind Ekaterini Voggoli, Anastasia Kelesidou and Styliani Tsikouna.

Honours

References
 

1974 births
Living people
Greek female discus throwers
Mediterranean Games gold medalists for Greece
Athletes (track and field) at the 2001 Mediterranean Games
Mediterranean Games medalists in athletics